Felipe Benevides (born 1 March 1989) is a Brazilian footballer who currently plays for MyPa in Finnish Veikkausliiga.

References
 Guardian Football

Brazilian expatriate footballers
Brazilian footballers
Expatriate footballers in Finland
Brazilian expatriate sportspeople in Finland
Veikkausliiga players
Myllykosken Pallo −47 players
Living people
1989 births
Association football midfielders